Oļegs Andrejevs (born 12 September 1980) is a Latvian cross-country skier. He competed in the men's sprint event at the 2006 Winter Olympics.

References

1980 births
Living people
Latvian male cross-country skiers
Olympic cross-country skiers of Latvia
Cross-country skiers at the 2006 Winter Olympics
People from Krāslava Municipality